Kenneth D. Loeffler (April 14, 1902 – January 1, 1975) was an American collegiate and professional basketball coach. He was mostly known for guiding the La Salle Explorers men's basketball team to the 1952 National Invitation Tournament and 1954 NCAA basketball tournament titles.

After earning a Bachelor's degree at Pennsylvania State University (1920–24) and a short pro basketball career (1924–29), the Beaver Falls, Pennsylvania native began his collegiate coaching career at Geneva College (1928–35). In 1935 he became basketball head coach at Yale University, and also assistant coach to the football and baseball varsity. In seven years at Yale Loeffler put up a 61–82 record. During World War II he served in the U.S. Air Force.

After the war Loeffler began coaching pro teams in the Basketball Association of America, first the St. Louis Bombers (1946–48), then the Providence Steamrollers (1948–49). In 1949 he returned to the college ranks when he became head coach at La Salle. With players like future Hall of Famer Tom Gola, Loeffler's La Salle teams went on to dominate college basketball over half a decade in the early 1950s.  In six seasons at La Salle, Loeffler led the Explorers to a post-season appearance in every single season.  Under Loeffler, La Salle made four trips to the NIT (before it was considered "second-rate") and two visits to the NCAA tournament. In 1955 Loeffler moved on to become the head coach at Texas A&M College, a post he held until 1957.

On October 1, 1964, Loeffler was elected to the Naismith Memorial Basketball Hall of Fame.  He died on January 1, 1975, of an apparent heart attack, in Rumson, New Jersey.

Head coaching record

College

Professional basketball

|-
| style="text-align:left;"|SLB
| style="text-align:left;"|
|61||38||23||.623|| style="text-align:center;"|2nd in Western||3||1||2||.333
| style="text-align:center;"|Lost in League Quarterfinals
|-
| style="text-align:left;"|SLB
| style="text-align:left;"|
|48||29||19||.604|| style="text-align:center;"|1st in Western||7||3||4||.429
| style="text-align:center;"|Lost in League Semifinals
|-
| style="text-align:left;"|PRO
| style="text-align:left;"|
|60||12||48||.200|| style="text-align:center;"|6th in Eastern||-||-||-||-
| style="text-align:center;"|Missed Playoffs
|- class="sortbottom"
| style="text-align:left;"|Career
| ||169||79||90||.467|| ||10||4||6||.400

See also
 List of NCAA Division I Men's Final Four appearances by coach

References

External links
 

1902 births
1975 deaths
American men's basketball coaches
American men's basketball players
Basketball coaches from Pennsylvania
Basketball players from Pennsylvania
College men's basketball head coaches in the United States
Denver Pioneers men's basketball coaches
Geneva Golden Tornadoes men's basketball coaches
La Salle Explorers men's basketball coaches
Naismith Memorial Basketball Hall of Fame inductees
National Collegiate Basketball Hall of Fame inductees
Penn State Nittany Lions basketball players
Providence Steamrollers coaches
St. Louis Bombers (NBA) coaches
Texas A&M Aggies men's basketball coaches
Yale Bulldogs baseball coaches
Yale Bulldogs football coaches
Yale Bulldogs men's basketball coaches
Monmouth University faculty